Brian Raymond Halonen (born January 11, 1999) is an American professional ice hockey Left wing for the Utica Comets of the American Hockey League (AHL) as a prospect for the New Jersey Devils of the National Hockey League (NHL). He played college ice hockey for Michigan Tech.

Playing career

Collegiate
Halonen began his collegiate career for Michigan Tech during the 2018–19 season, where he recorded 12 goals and nine assists in 35 games. He led the Huskies and all WCHA rookies with 12 goals. Following the season he was named to the All-WCHA Rookie Team and awarded the Norbert Matovich Memorial Outstanding Freshman Award. During the 2019–20 season in his sophomore year, he recorded 12 goals and ten assists in 39 games, and ranked fourth on the team with 22 points. During the 2020–21 season in his junior year, he recorded eight goals and ten assists in 28 games, and ranked third on the team with 18 points. He ranked sixth in the nation with four game-winning goals.

During the 2021–22 season in his senior year he recorded 21 goals and 23 assists in 37 games. He led the CCHA in points (36) and goals (16), and ranked fifth in the CCHA in assists (20) during conference games. He recorded six goals and eight assists with 45 shots on goal during the month of February. On February 11, 2022, he became the 68th player in program history to reach 100 points in a career. He was subsequently named the CCHA Forward of the Month. 

During the regional semifinal of the 2022 NCAA Tournament, Halonen was ejected from the game for a checking-from-behind penalty. The Huskies lost the game 0–3 to Minnesota Duluth, ending Halonen's collegiate career. Following an outstanding season, he was named a top-ten finalist for the Hobey Baker Award, becoming the fifth player in program history to be named a finalist for the award. He was also named to the All-CCHA First Team, and an AHCA West Second Team All-American.

Professional
On March 28, 2022, Halonen signed a two-year, entry-level contract with the New Jersey Devils beginning with the 2022–23 season. He was assigned to the Utica Comets of the AHL on an amateur tryout contract for the remainder of the 2021–22 season. On April 2, 2022, he recorded his first professional goal in his second career game.

Personal life
Brian was born to Jim and Carol Halonen. He has 10 siblings, an older sister and older brother, three younger sisters, and five younger brothers. He is the cousin of professional ice hockey player Blake Pietila.

Career statistics

Awards and honors

References

External links
 

1999 births
Living people
Adirondack Thunder players
AHCA Division I men's ice hockey All-Americans
Des Moines Buccaneers players
Ice hockey people from Minnesota
Michigan Tech Huskies men's ice hockey players
Sportspeople from Minneapolis
Utica Comets players